Mária Bellová (1885-1973), was an physician in the Austro-Hungarian Empire and later in Czechoslovakia. 

She became a physician in 1910.

References

1885 births
1973 deaths
Austro-Hungarian physicians
Czechoslovak physicians
Date of birth missing
Date of death missing